The Coeur d'Alene Resort is a resort hotel in the northwest United States, located in Coeur d’Alene, Idaho. Seated on the north shore of Lake Coeur d'Alene by Tubbs Hill, the resort features a marina, convention facilities, spa, as well as a notable 18-hole golf course.

At  in height, it is the tallest building in northern Idaho and the third-highest in the state.

History
The "North Shore Resort" opened  in 1965 and completed its seven-story tower in 1973; it was acquired by Hagadone Hospitality in June 1983 in a takeover of  Duane Hagadone soon announced plans for resort  and the North Shore closed on New Year's Day in 1986 for several months; it reopened in the spring with a new name:   The new 18-story addition, known as the Lake Tower, was built by Hagadone and Jerry Jaeger and opened   Designed by architect R.G. Nelson, the hotel features a  floating boardwalk around the marina.

The golf course is about a mile east (1.6 km) of the resort and was originally the site of the Rutledge  which operated from  closing on  The Hagadone Corporation bought the property from Potlatch Corporation in March 1988 via   and its buildings were allowed to be burned in June; local fire departments used it as a 

With environmental concerns allayed, the project was well received in January and course construction began in 1989.

The seven-story Park Tower (1973), completed a renovation  as did the signature Lake Tower (1986)

Golf course

The resort's golf course is best known for its floating green on the 14th hole, and location on the north shore   floating green was installed in September 1990 and unveiled by Hagadone and Governor Cecil Andrus shortly  the course opened the  "Putter" is the vessel that shuttles players to and from 

Phoenix-based designer Scott Miller planned the course to feel like a park, and it has since been ranked among the best resort golf courses in the United States by Golf Digest, Golf Magazine and others.

Scorecard

Source:

References

External links
 
 The Coeur d'Alene Resort Golf Course
 YouTube – The Coeur d'Alene & The Floating Green – Golf Channel (2010)
 Golf Course Gurus – Coeur d'Alene Resort

  

Golf clubs and courses in Idaho
Buildings and structures in Coeur d'Alene, Idaho
Tourist attractions in Kootenai County, Idaho
1991 establishments in Idaho